Julian Ivanovich Simashko (1821–1893) was a Russian zoologist and entomologist.

He wrote Russkaya Fauna published in Saint Petersburg in 1850, the first work on Russian fauna to include the Caucasus.

References
Schmitt, M. & Hübner, H. & Gaedicke, R. (1998): Nomina Auctorum, Auflösung von Abkürzungen taxonomischer Autoren-Namen.  Nova Supplementa Entomologica 11: 189 pp.; Eberswalde.

1821 births
1893 deaths
Russian zoologists
Russian entomologists
Biologists from the Russian Empire